Philip Eldon Smith (born 15 October 1934) is a former United States Air Force fighter pilot who was held captive in China for seven and a half years.

Early life
Smith was born in Roodhouse, Illinois. After attending high school he completed a special two year curriculum at the Institute of Aviation, University of Illinois.

USAF career
He joined the United States Air Force and in June 1957, graduated from Air Force Pilot Training. He later flew the F-86F, the F-100 and then the F-104. He volunteered for combat duty and in September 1965 was flying the F-104C with the 436th Tactical Fighter Squadron based at Da Nang Air Base, South Vietnam.

Capture

On 20 September 1965 Smith was flying his F-104C #56-883 on a mission to escort an EC-121 over the Gulf of Tonkin when due to equipment failure and incorrect navigational commands he strayed into Chinese airspace over Hainan. His aircraft was intercepted and shot down by two Shenyang J-6 fighters of the People's Liberation Army Naval Air Force near Haikou. Smith ejected successfully and was captured by PLA forces. On 21 September the U.S. military acknowledged that Smith was missing and reported that Smith had radioed that he was experiencing mechanical problems and fuel shortage, but did not confirm that he had been shot down.

Initially he refused to speak to the PLA Navy personnel who captured him. However, when a PLA Air Force Officer entered the room, He stood up and gave a salute. He explained that he did not realise the PLA Navy personnel were regular forces, citing their newly changed grey Type 65 Navy uniforms.

He was first taken to Guangzhou for interrogation and then later transferred to Beijing. Most of his captivity was spent in solitary confinement; however, he did meet John T. Downey and Richard Fecteau both of whom were CIA agents captured in 1952.

Release
Due to improving US-China relations following President Richard Nixon's historic 1972 visit to China, Smith and United States Navy Commander Robert J. Flynn who was shot down in 1967 were released on 15 March 1973, crossing the land border into the British Hong Kong where they were received by a representative of the American Red Cross and U.S. consular officials. Both men were then flown by helicopter to Kai Tak Airport and then flown to Clark Air Base in The Philippines where they were processed together with U.S. prisoners of war released from North Vietnam as part of Operation Homecoming.

Post-release
Smith returned to USAF duty and retired with the rank of Colonel in December 1987.

References

1934 births
Living people
American people imprisoned abroad
Prisoners and detainees of the People's Republic of China
United States Air Force officers
United States Air Force personnel of the Vietnam War
Shot-down aviators
Recipients of the Legion of Merit
Recipients of the Silver Star
Recipients of the Air Medal
Recipients of the Meritorious Service Medal (United States)
Aviators from Illinois
Military personnel from Illinois
People from Greene County, Illinois